Andria Hunter (born December 22, 1967) is a Canadian retired ice hockey player and former member of the Canadian women's national ice hockey team and national inline hockey team. In 1994, she created the website whockey.com, one of the earliest sites dedicated to women's ice hockey on the web, which remains one of the few digital records of women's ice hockey during the 1990s and early 2000s.

Playing career

Early years
As a student at Thomas A. Stewart Secondary School in her hometown of Peterborough, Ontario, Hunter was a standout athlete and scholar. She received the school's Junior Athlete Award in 1983 and the Senior Athlete Award in 1985. In grade thirteen, she played on seven different school teams – cross country, field hockey, badminton, ice hockey, volleyball, track, and soccer – in addition to playing ice hockey with Tri Counties Hockey (presently run as Keene Wolverines) senior women's team. She graduated in 1986 as the class valedictorian and was the recipient of the 1996 Graduating Athlete Award.

University
In her final year of secondary school, Hunter received an offer for and accepted a full-tuition athletic scholarship to the University of New Hampshire (UNH). As a member of the New Hampshire Wildcats women's ice hockey program, she was the team point leader in three of her four seasons and served as captain in her senior year. The Wildcats claimed the ECAC Championship twice during Hunter's tenure, first in 1987 and under her captaincy in 1990, and placed second in the conference in the other two years. 

After graduating from UNH in 1990, Hunter opted to pursue a Master of Science degree at the University of Toronto and joined the Toronto Varsity Blues women's ice hockey program, playing 5 years (1990-92,1993-96). During that time, the Varsity Blues won four Ontario Women's Intercollegiate Athletics Association Ice Hockey Championships, Hunter was named to the First Team All-Star every year, and she recorded 123 points in 55 games. At the time of her retirement, Hunter topped the Ontario league's career scoring list.

National Women's Hockey League
Hunter played a total of 10 seasons in the Central Ontario Women's Hockey League and the National Women's Hockey League (1999–2007):
 3 seasons with the Scarborough Firefighters (1990-91, 1991-92, 1993-94)
 1 season with the Toronto Red Wings (1995-96)
 1 season with the Newtonbrook Panthers (1996-97
 3 seasons with the Mississauga Chiefs (1997-98), 1998-99, 1999-2000)
 2 seasons with the Mississauga Ice Bears (2000-01, 2001-02)
Hunter finished 3rd overall in league scoring in her tenth and final year (17 goals, 21 assists, 38 points)

Swiss Women's Hockey League A
During the 1992–93 season, Hunter competed for DHC Langenthal in the Swiss Leistungsklasse A (LKA). With DHC Langenthal, Hunter led the league in scoring, netting 59 goals and tallying 28 assists in 20 games.

International play
At the 1992 IIHF Women's World Championship in Tampere, Finland, Hunter played on a line with Angela James and Margot Page. She was the third-highest overall scorer in the tournament, collecting five goals and four assists across five games.

She was also part of Team Canada's gold winning entry at the 1994 IIHF Women's World Championship.

Other
Hunter was also an accomplished ball hockey player. Hunter competed with the Toronto Dragons that won the ball hockey National Championships in 1991, and placed second in 1992 and 1994. Hunter was also a member of the Canada women's national inline hockey team, winning a gold medal at the 2002 FIRS Inline Hockey World Championships.

Personal life 
Hunter holds a BSc in computer science from the University of New Hampshire and a MSc in computer science from the University of Toronto.

Career Statistics

University of New Hampshire

National Women's Hockey League

Hockey Canada

Awards and honours
2002 Isobel Gathorne-Hardy Award, Hockey Canada
All-Star First Team, Ontario University Athletics women's ice hockey
1995–96
1994–95
1993–94
1991–92
1990–91
1993–94 Toronto Blues Most Sportsmanlike Player, University of Toronto
T-Holders Academic Excellence Award, University of Toronto
1991–92
1993–94

References

1967 births
Canadian women's ice hockey forwards
Canadian women's national inline hockey team players
Ice hockey people from Ontario
Living people
New Hampshire Wildcats women's ice hockey players
Sportspeople from Peterborough, Ontario
University of Toronto alumni